Runar "Pannan" Sandström (12 June 1909 – 8 March 1985) was a Swedish water polo player who competed in the 1936 Summer Olympics. In 1936 he was part of the Swedish team which finished seventh in the water polo tournament. He played three matches.

References

1909 births
1985 deaths
Swedish male water polo players
Olympic water polo players of Sweden
Water polo players at the 1936 Summer Olympics